Dirk Frans Elisabeth Thys van den Audenaerde (born March 14, 1934, in Mechelen) is a Belgian ichthyologist. He is an honorary director of the Royal Museum for Central Africa and professor emeritus at the KU Leuven.

References 

1934 births
Living people
Belgian ichthyologists
Belgian biologists
Academic staff of KU Leuven